The Subarnarekha River (also called the Swarnarekha River) flows through the Indian states of Jharkhand, West Bengal and Odisha.

Etymology
As per tradition, gold was mined near the origin of the river at a village named Piska near Ranchi. This is why it was named Subarnarekha, meaning "streak of gold". Legend has it that traces of gold were found in the river bed. Even now, people look for traces of gold particles in its sandy beds. The name is a combination of two words meaning gold and line/ streak in Indian languages.

Course

After originating near piska/nagri, near Ranchi, the  capital of Jharkhand, the Subarnarekha traverses a long distance through RanchiSeraikela Kharsawan and East Singhbhum districts in the state.

The basin of the Subarnarekha is smaller than most multi-state river basins in India. The rain-fed river covers a drainage area of

Tributaries

The prominent tributaries of the Subarnarekha are Kharkai, Roro, Kanchi, Harmu Nadi, Damra, Karru, Chinguru, Karakari, Gurma, Garra, Singaduba, Kodia, Dulunga and Khaijori. The Kharkai meets the Subarnarekha at Sonari (Domuhani), a neighborhood of Jamshedpur.

Hundru Falls

The spectacular sight of water falling from such a great height is a sight to behold. The different rock formations due to erosion by the constantly falling water have added to the beauty of the place.

Pollution
The Subarnarekha passes through areas with extensive mining of copper and uranium ores. As a result of the unplanned mining activities, the river is polluted. The Subarnarekha has been the lifeline of tribal communities inhabiting the Chhotanagpur region and water pollution affects their livelihood. It is getting more pollutants from the aluminium factory of Muri.

Flood
Several areas in the lower reaches of the Subarnarekha, particularly the coastal areas of Odisha and West Bengal, are within the flood hazard zone. In 2009, the Subarnarekha witnessed flash floods following heavy rainfall in the upper catchment areas of the river. During the flood, large areas of Jaleswar, Bhograi and Baliapal blocks and a small pocket of Basta block in Balasore district of Odisha were affected. Certain areas of Medinipur in West Bengal are also affected by floods.

Projects

Getalsud
Completed in 1971, this multi-purpose reservoir was envisaged mainly to meet municipal water demands of Ranchi city and the adjoining industrial area. There are two power houses in Sikidiri with one unit of 65 MW each. Sikidiri Hydal Power Plants are the only hydal projects in Jharkhand.

Subarnarekha multipurpose project
The Subarnarekha multipurpose project envisaged the construction of two dams, one at Chandil across the Subarnarekha and the other across the Kharkai at Icha near Chaibasa, two barrages at Galudih across the Subarnarekha and the other across the Kharkai at Ganjia near Adityapur and a network of canals from these. Three small storage reservoirs and a network of canals from these reservoirs are in Orissa. Started in 1982–83, the multipurpose project was planned for irrigation, hydropower generation and water supply. While the Chandil dam and Galudih barrage are almost complete, the other components are still incomplete. The project was taken up for construction in the year 1995–96.

The Chandil Dam and reservoir required  of land. The Ganjia Barrage required  of land. The canal network required additional land. The project experienced protests from its inception in 1975 and, in 1978, some 10,000 of them demonstrated against the dam at the construction site. To address the protests, the government increased the compensation package for 12,000 families and 2,200 people got jobs in different government departments.

The construction of Chandil dam, Icha dam and Galudih barrage are complete. This dam is one of the most visited places of Jharkhand. The museum located close to the Chandil dam has scripts written on rocks, which are 2,000 years old.

Subarnarekha port

The Government of Odisha has signed a memorandum of understanding with Chennai-based Creative Port Development Pvt. Ltd. for the development of a deep-water, all-weather project at Kirtania at the mouth of the Subarnarekha. The Kirtania Port project was being taken up on a 50-year build, own, operate, share and transfer (boost) basis. The development would include a dedicated rail cum road connection from the port to the NH 5 and rail network at Jaleswar. More recently the project is being referred to as Subarnarekha port. The foundation stone was laid in 2019.

Film
Ritwik Ghatak directed a Bengali film Subarnarekha in 1965. Ghatak's films are deeply haunted by the spectre of the partition of Bengal in 1947. In the film Subarnarekha, Ghatak "has rendered the very idea of home as a sentimental place on an elusive other side that, like the distant, opposing banks of the Subarnarekha River, symbolically represents an idealized, and intranscendible, elsewhere."

References

Rivers of Jharkhand
Rivers of West Bengal
Rivers of Odisha
Rivers of India